Mick Lynch (12 May 1878 – 14 June 1944) was an Australian rules footballer who played with Collingwood in the Victorian Football League (VFL).

In 1899 he was cleared to Richmond but he never played a senior game for them.

Notes

External links 

Mick Lynch's profile at Collingwood Forever

1878 births
1944 deaths
Australian rules footballers from Geelong
Collingwood Football Club players